Syberia II is a 2004 graphic adventure game developed and published by MC2-Microïds. As the direct sequel to 2002's Syberia, it is a third-person puzzle-solving game. Although it is stylistically identical, Syberia II improves upon the first game by introducing more realistic character animation. The game includes a recap of the first chapter, so it does not require the player to have experienced the first game.

Syberia II achieved global sales of 600,000 units by early 2006. The game was received favorably by critics.

Gameplay 

Like its predecessor, Syberia II is a third-person, mouse-driven adventure game in which the player must solve various puzzles and follow certain procedures in order for the linear storyline to proceed.  As a pure graphical adventure game, Syberia follows the guidelines first introduced by LucasArts: it is impossible to die or to get stuck at any moment in the game, which allows the user to become fully immersed in Syberias universe without the fear of making a mistake or the constant need to save the game.

Plot
The game begins following the events of Syberia with the law firm that American lawyer Kate Walker worked for in New York, calling in a private detective. The firm instructs the detective to locate and find Walker since heading out to oversee a business takeover of an automaton toy factory, who has since abandoned her job, hoping to appease her family in bringing her back home. In the fictional Russian town of Romansburg, Kate provides assistance for eccentric inventor Hans Voralberg, who seeks to find living prehistoric mammoths, and his automaton train engineer Oscar, by prepping his specially crafted clockwork train with coal. Shortly after completing this, Hans falls ill, forcing Kate to seek treatment for him at a nearby monastery perched on a clifftop.

When she learns that the patriarch believes he cannot be cured and decides he should be given spiritual salvation, Kate opts to find a cure for Hans, learning about a friend of his who uncovered information on Youkol medicine. Finding his notebook hidden in the monastery, Kate recreates the medicine and uses it to treat Hans, before being forced to create an escape route for the pair when the patriarch refuses to let them leave. Returning to Romansburg, Kate agrees to take a mechanical part to a local tavern and repair an automaton device he created there for its owner. Upon completing the task, Kate hears the train leaving the station, and learns that two locals, brothers Ivan and Igor, hijacked with the intention of reaching the fabled island of Syberia (inspired by the real-life location of Wrangel Island in Siberia, the last place on earth where mammoths survived), so as to profit from harvesting mammoth ivory. Forced to pursue them, Kate makes use of a railroad gangcar, used for maintenance, which she powers with a friendly Youki - an animal that is part seal, part bear, with dog-like traits.

Kate manages to catch up with the train, only to see that the two men abandoned it after it got stuck at a collapsed bridge, and fled by snowmobile with Hans. Disconnecting the passenger car from the locomotive, Kate, after restoring Oscar to full functions, continues pursuing them. The pair eventually track the thieves to a large statue in front of the railroad tracks. Kate discovers from Igor, who is having second thoughts and wants to return home, that Hans disappeared shortly after the brothers arrived. Confronting Ivan over her friend's location at the base of the statue, Kate is quickly trapped by him on the belief she intends to steal his ivory. Just before he is about to kill her, the ice beneath the statue they are standing on cracks and breaks up, sending Kate plunging underground.

Upon awaking, she finds herself within a hidden underground Youkol village, in which Hans is being treated by a local shaman who reveals he is on his deathbed. After managing to bring the locomotive into the village, Kate acquires the means for the shaman to transport her into Hans' dreams, which recreate the village of Valadilène, and manages to reach him. Although she convinces him to wake up, she finds herself given cryptic words by him before exiting the dream world. When she asks Oscar what these means, the automaton leaves the locomotive to join his creator, whereupon Kate discovers that he was designed with a primitive exo-skeleton/life-support system to provide Hans the means to stay alive and fulfill his dreams. After witnessing Hans being placed within this, Kate learns that to reach Syberia, she must thaw out a Youkol boat within the village, and does so through using the locomotive, discovering Hans designed it for this purpose.

Boarding the boat, Kate, Hans and their Youki partner, soon become stuck in an ice floe. When Kate works to free them, the boat is hijacked by Ivan, who intends to leave Kate and continue to Syberia, but finds himself unable to operate the craft. Kate manages to return onboard and forces him off, whereupon he attempts to toss a penguin egg (a fictional North Pole species resembling emperor penguins) in defiance at her actions, only to anger the penguins guarding their nest and causing them to kill him. Eventually Kate and Hans arrive at Syberia, whereupon they manage to use ancient Youkol horns to summon a herd of mammoths. Hans, delighted to meet them, is gladly allowed on their backs and rides off with them, as Kate waves him a tearful goodbye. Meanwhile, the law firm learn from their private detective that despite his best efforts following her, he calls it quits on his job, claiming she has vanished without a trace.

Development 
Syberia II was announced in October 2002, and was initially set for an October 2003 launch date. The game was produced in 13 months using Virtools Dev 3.0 development tools.  Benoît Sokal indicated in an interview that at one time the development team was considering to create one single game for the entire Syberia story, but decided not to as it was so large.

In September 2003, Syberia II was delayed to the following year. It reached gold status on March 2, 2004, and was released for computers on March 30 in North America. Its Xbox version launched in the region on October 12 of that year. While Syberia II had been released for the PlayStation 2 in European countries by then, this version was rejected for a North American launch by Sony Computer Entertainment America (SCEA). GameSpot's Tor Thorsen said that SCEA's decision was made "due to the adventure genre's lukewarm popularity stateside". The company had previously rejected the PlayStation 2 version of Syberia.

Reception

Sales
In Germany, Syberia II placed 28th in Media Control's computer game sales rankings for June 2004. According to Edouard Lussan of Microïds, the game had achieved sales of 215,000 copies in Europe and the United States combined by that month. Another 100,000 units of its computer version had already been sold in Russia. By late 2005, Syberia II was on track to reach 600,000 sales overall, a number it had reached by March 2006. Total worldwide sales of the Syberia series surpassed 1 million units by 2008, and rose to 3 million by 2016, before the release of Syberia 3.

Reviews and awards

Review aggregation website Metacritic reported Syberia IIs critical reception as "generally favorable" for its computer release, but summarized that of its Xbox version as "mixed or average".

Syberia II was a nominee for GameSpot's 2004 "Best Adventure Game" award, which ultimately went to Myst IV: Revelation. In 2011, Adventure Gamers named Syberia II the 55th-best adventure game ever released.

Legacy 
While Syberia featured a cliffhanger ending, a common complaint among reviewers is that the ending of Syberia II is either too abrupt or too depressing, depending on their understanding of the final scene. Indeed, the game does not provide any clear explanation about what becomes of Kate after she reaches Syberia with Hans. Benoît Sokal had stated in interviews it was at that time unlikely that Syberia III would be made.

On 26 November 2012, Microïds revealed on their Facebook page that Benoît Sokal had officially signed a contract with Anuman to write the story of Syberia III and that official development had started. Additionally the project is to be overseen by Elliot Grassiano, the original founder of Microïds. Sokal left Microïds shortly after the release of Syberia II and founded his own company White Birds Productions to release Paradise, a game that uses a similar style of gameplay as Syberia but is not directly related. A sequel, Syberia 3, was released in April 2017.

References

External links 
 Microids website
 

2004 video games
Android (operating system) games
IOS games
Microïds games
MacOS games
Nintendo Switch games
PlayStation 2 games
PlayStation Network games
PlayStation 3 games
Point-and-click adventure games
Syberia
Video game sequels
Video games scored by Inon Zur
Video games developed in France
Video games featuring female protagonists
Video games set in Europe
Video games set in Russia
Windows games
Windows Mobile games
Xbox games
Xbox 360 games
Xbox 360 Live Arcade games